Michael II was the Patriarch of Antioch and head of the Syriac Orthodox Church from 1292 until his death in 1312.

Biography
Barsoum was born in the 13th century, and became the abbot of the Monastery of Gawikat, near Mopsuestia in Cilicia. After the death of Patriarch Philoxenus I Nemrud, Barsoum was consecrated as his successor as patriarch of Antioch in November 1292 by Iyawannis, archbishop of Tarsus, and Basil, archbishop of Jerusalem, and assumed the name Michael. Schism within the church erupted at this time as Constantine proclaimed himself patriarch at Melitene, and Ignatius bar Wahib was consecrated as patriarch of Mardin in January 1293.

Michael issued a general proclamation on 6 January 1295 declaring his ascension to the patriarchate, and excommunicated Constantine of Melitene and his supporters. The proclamation was also signed by the aforementioned Iyawannis and Basil. In 1301, he resided at the White Monastery near Dara. He served as patriarch of Antioch until his death on 7 December 1312.

References
Notes

Citations

Bibliography

Syriac Patriarchs of Antioch from 512 to 1783
13th-century births
1312 deaths
Year of birth unknown
13th-century Oriental Orthodox archbishops
14th-century Oriental Orthodox archbishops